Risimina Glacier is the 10 km long and 4.5 km wide glacier in Lovech Heights on Nordenskjöld Coast in Graham Land, Antarctica situated south of Zlokuchene Glacier and north of the lower course of Rogosh Glacier.  It is draining the southeast slopes of Mount Moriya, and flowing east-southeastwards to enter Weddell Sea west of Pedersen Nunatak.

The feature is named after Risimina Cave in northwestern Bulgaria.

Location
British mapping in 1978.

Maps
 Antarctic Digital Database (ADD). Scale 1:250000 topographic map of Antarctica. Scientific Committee on Antarctic Research (SCAR). Since 1993, regularly upgraded and updated.

References
 Risimina Glacier. SCAR Composite Antarctic Gazetteer.
 Bulgarian Antarctic Gazetteer. Antarctic Place-names Commission. (details in Bulgarian, basic data in English)

External links
 Risimina Glacier. Copernix satellite image

Bulgaria and the Antarctic
Glaciers of Nordenskjöld Coast